Gulbawri is a residential area of Hazaras in Afghanistan located in the district of Jaghatū of Ghazni Province.

Climate

See also 
 Jaghatū District
 Ghazni Province

Notes 

Jaghatū District
Populated places in Ghazni Province
Ghazni Province
Hazarajat